Q Scorpii, also designated as HD 159433, is an astrometric binary (100% chance) located in the southern zodiac constellation Scorpius. It has an apparent magnitude of 4.27, making it readily visible to the naked eye under ideal conditions.

The visible component is a red giant with a stellar classification of K0 IIIb. The IIIb luminosity class indicates that it is a lower luminosity giant star. Q Scorpii is a red clump star located on the cool end of the horizontal branch, fusing helium at its core. It has 110% the mass of the Sun but has expanded to 12.4 times its girth. Q Scorpii has an iron abundance half of the Sun's, making it metal deficient.

References

K-type giants
Horizontal-branch stars
High-proper-motion stars
Scorpius (constellation)
Scorpii, Q
CD-38 12044
159433
086170
6546
Scorpii, 159